Loebl or Löbl is a surname of Hebrew origin literally meaning "little heart". It consists of the word "heart" (לב, Loeb, Löb) in Hebrew plus Yiddish diminutive suffix "-l". When Jews were required to Germanize their names, "Loeb + l" was converted into "Herz + l", i.e., Herzl

The surname may refer to:
Herbert Loebl (1923-2013), British businessman
Greta Loebl (1917-2005), born Greta Loebl, Austrian-American, Jewish jewelry designer and painter
Eugen Loebl (1907-1987), a former Czechoslovak official who survived the Slánský trial

References

Hebrew-language surnames